Catherine Léger (born 1980) is a Canadian playwright and screenwriter from Quebec.

A graduate of the National Theatre School of Canada, she won the Prix Gratien-Gélinas in 2006 for her theatrical play Voiture américaine. Her subsequent plays have included Opium_37 (2010), Princesses (2011), J'ai perdu mon mari (2015), Filles en liberté (2017) and Baby-sitter (2017).

She wrote for the television series Au secours de Béatrice, Marche à l'ombre and Les invisibles, and wrote the screenplays for the films The Little Queen (La petite reine) and Slut in a Good Way (Charlotte a du fun). She won the Canadian Screen Award for Best Original Screenplay at the 7th Canadian Screen Awards in 2019 for Slut in a Good Way.

She wrote the screenplay for Babysitter, Monia Chokri's 2022 film adaptation of Léger's theatrical play of the same name.

References

External links

1980 births
21st-century Canadian dramatists and playwrights
21st-century Canadian screenwriters
21st-century Canadian women writers
Canadian women dramatists and playwrights
Canadian women screenwriters
Canadian television writers
Canadian dramatists and playwrights in French
Canadian screenwriters in French
Writers from Quebec
National Theatre School of Canada alumni
French Quebecers
Living people
Best Screenplay Genie and Canadian Screen Award winners
Canadian women television writers